Smim Sawhtut (died August 1550) was a pretender to the Hanthawaddy throne, who assassinated King Tabinshwehti of Toungoo. The ethnic Mon governor of Sittaung was a minister in the court of Tabinshwehti, who had conquered the Mon-speaking Hanthawaddy Pegu in 1539. He became a close confidant of the king. On 30 April 1550, he lured the king to the region near Pantanaw in the Irrawaddy delta to search for a white elephant—considered auspicious by the Burmese, and there assassinated him.

After the assassination, Smim Sawhtut returned to Sittaung, and proclaimed himself king. About a month a half later, the ethnic Mon ministers at the capital Pegu (Bago) then drove out Minkhaung, Bayinnaung's brother who was there as the interim governor while Tabinshwehti and Bayinnaung were away. (Bayinnaung was away in the delta, chasing Smim Htaw, another pretender to the throne.) The ministers then invited Sawhtut, though not of royal lineage, to take the throne, thus restoring the Mon lineage of the dynasty.

At Pegu, Sawhtut proved a tyrant as king, and soon alienated the goodwill of the people had felt for a king of their own ethnicity. The ministers then secretly invited Smim Htaw, who had been driven out of the delta by Bayinnaung, and had since fled to Martaban, to Pegu. (Bayinnaung was back in his home town of Toungoo in the north, preparing for the reconquest.) Smim Htaw collected a large body of men, and marched to Pegu. The two sides fought a battle outside the capital. Smim Htaw's side was victorious. Smim Sawhtut was captured and beheaded.

References

Hanthawaddy dynasty
1550 deaths
Burmese people of Mon descent
Year of birth unknown
16th-century Burmese monarchs